Englewood is a census-designated place (CDP) in Schuylkill County, Pennsylvania, United States. The population was 484 at the 2000 census.

Geography
Englewood is located at  (40.782437, -76.242171).

Demographics

At the 2000 census there were 484 people, 198 households, and 140 families living in the CDP. The population density was 1,013.1 people per square mile (389.3/km). There were 207 housing units at an average density of 433.3/sq mi (166.5/km).  The racial makeup of the CDP was 100.00% White.
Of the 198 households 25.3% had children under the age of 18 living with them, 61.6% were married couples living together, 6.1% had a female householder with no husband present, and 28.8% were non-families. 26.3% of households were one person and 15.2% were one person aged 65 or older. The average household size was 2.44 and the average family size was 2.94.

The age distribution was 20.5% under the age of 18, 5.6% from 18 to 24, 22.9% from 25 to 44, 30.8% from 45 to 64, and 20.2% 65 or older. The median age was 46 years. For every 100 females, there were 91.3 males. For every 100 females age 18 and over, there were 93.5 males.

The median household income was $35,795 and the median family income  was $43,359. Males had a median income of $39,500 versus $21,875 for females. The per capita income for the CDP was $15,547. About 4.4% of families and 4.4% of the population were below the poverty line, including 7.6% of those under age 18 and none of those age 65 or over.

References

Census-designated places in Schuylkill County, Pennsylvania
Census-designated places in Pennsylvania